Ford Motor Credit Company LLC, d/b/a Ford Credit, is the financial services arm of Ford Motor Company, and is headquartered in Dearborn, Michigan.

The predominant share of Ford Credit's business consists of financing Ford and Lincoln vehicles and supporting Ford and Lincoln dealers. Specifically, its business activities are concentrated in the area of automobile financing for consumers and dealership inventory and leasing. Ford Credit competes mainly on the basis of service and financing rate programs, including those sponsored by Ford. A key foundation of its service is providing broad and consistent purchasing policies for retail installment sale and lease contracts, and consistent support for dealer financing requirements across economic cycles. These policies have helped Ford Credit build strong relationships with Ford's dealer network that enhance competitiveness. Ford Credit also provides commercial financing and lines of credit to dealerships selling Ford Motor Company products. The firm also issues commercial paper and other debt instruments on Ford's behalf.

Ford Credit also owns Lincoln Automotive Financial Services, the arm that finances Lincoln vehicles.

Ford earned $2.63 billion EBIT with its Ford Credit segment in 2018, up from $2.31 billion in 2017. 2018 was the segment's highest full-year EBT in eight years. However, this upward trend may not last much longer as car sales continue to decline. Ford Credit's ROE, which fell from 22% in 2017 to 14% in 2018 forecasts the segment's coming decline.

History

Ford began its journey into auto financing by launching a Weekly Purchase Plan in 1923. The program was designed to allow people to pay a certain amount to the bank weekly up until they had saved for the cost of a car. In 1926 Henry Ford founded the Ford Credit Company AG in Berlin. Ford had also constructed a new factory in Germany at that time, but most of the local population could not buy a car, Ford founded the bank to help finance a car purchase. Henry and Edsel Ford became members of the board. In 1932 the now called Credit AG für Ford-Fahrzeuge and the factory moved to Cologne. In 1962 it was renamed again to Ford Credit AG.

From 1975 to 1979, the company briefly was the owner of the Houston Astros major league baseball team, as well as of its ballpark, the Astrodome, and various other properties around Houston, Texas. This came about because Astros owner Roy Hofheinz defaulted on a loan provided in 1972 by the Company in partnership with GE Capital. The default resulted from a downturn in the oil industry, and the creditors took over these various assets as a result. Senior loan officer Bill Odom, who would later rise to be the Chairman of Ford Motor Credit Company, acted as principal for the temporary ownership group, until the team was sold in 1979 to a group headed by John McMullen. 

The credit arm of Ford Motor Company was created with the purchase of Associates First Capital Corporation from Gulf+Western in 1989.

Since the automotive industry crisis of 2008–10, Ford Credit has been the only financial arm of Detroit's "Big Three" still owned by its parent automaker after the spinoff of GMAC (now Ally Financial) by General Motors and the purchase of Chrysler Financial (now TD Auto Finance) by Toronto-Dominion Bank.

References

External links
 
 

Financial services companies established in 1959
Companies based in Wayne County, Michigan
Financial services companies of the United States
Credit